Hercostomoides is a genus of flies in the family Dolichopodidae. It is known from Asia to Australia and the western Pacific Ocean.

Species
The genus contains seven species:
 Hercostomoides baroalba Bickel, 2022 – Australia
 Hercostomoides bhartii Grichanov, 2017 – Indonesia (Highland Papua)
 Hercostomoides flavipleurus Bickel, 2022 – Australia
 Hercostomoides gagnei Bickel, 2022 – Australia
 Hercostomoides rufinus (Frey, 1925) (formerly Hercostomoides indonesianus (Hollis, 1964)) – Korea, Japan, China (Guangdong, Guangxi, Hainan, Zhejiang), Indonesia, India, Malaysia, Philippines, Singapore, Thailand, Vietnam, Australia
 Hercostomoides wauensis Bickel, 2022 – New Guinea
 Hercostomoides yapensis Bickel, 2022 – Yap Islands, Guam

References

Sympycninae
Dolichopodidae genera
Diptera of Asia
Diptera of Australasia
Insects of Oceania